Swindon railway station is on the Great Western Main Line in South West England, serving the town of Swindon, Wiltshire. It is managed by Great Western Railway, which also operates all the trains.

History 

The main line of the Great Western Railway (GWR) was built and opened in stages.

Meanwhile, the Cheltenham and Great Western Union Railway had in 1836 been authorised to link the GWR with Gloucester and Cheltenham, and for this line, a junction at Swindon had been decided upon. The GWR line was planned by Isambard Kingdom Brunel to rise from both London and Bristol to a summit near Swindon, and to have easy gradients east of that summit, and steeper gradients to the west. Brunel, and his colleague Daniel Gooch, decided in October 1840 that one locomotive would not be able to manage the whole distance without taking on fuel; and it would be necessary to change locomotives part-way. Reading was chosen as one place to change engines, being both a major station and, at just under , approximately one-third of the  distance from Paddington to Bristol. They also felt that it would be convenient to change locomotives at Swindon; not only was this almost two-thirds of the way (just over ) and the site of the junction for the Cheltenham line, it was also the summit of the line; and a train from London could have its fast locomotive replaced by a slower but more powerful locomotive for the journey on to Bristol. Accordingly, it was necessary to provide locomotive maintenance facilities at Swindon.

The proximity of the North Wilts Canal was also a factor, since it would enable coke for the locomotives and coal for the workshops to be supplied from the Somerset Coalfield at a reasonable price. The GWR had engaged the Westminster firm of Messrs. The GWR was short of money, and in late 1841 the contractors, instead of asking for payment, agreed to give Swindon station and its refreshment rooms to the GWR free of charge, and to lease back the refreshment rooms for 99 years at one (old) penny per year. Part of the deal was that  In this "reasonable period", not only could the passengers be refreshed but the locomotive would also be changed. Messrs. Rigby would then be able to use the profits from the refreshment rooms to recover their financial outlay. Not long after the contract was finalised, Rigby then sublet the rights to S. Y. Griffiths of Cheltenham for seven years, for which Griffiths paid Rigby £6,000 up front and then £1,100 per year. Before this expired, Rigby sold the lease to J. R. Phillips for £20,000 in August 1848.

With the railway passing through the town in early 1841, the Goddard Arms public house in Old Swindon was used as a railway booking office in lieu of a station. Tickets purchased included the fare for a horse-drawn carriage to the line at the bottom of the hill.

Swindon railway station opened in 1842 with construction of the GWR's engineering works continuing. Until 1895, every train stopped here for at least 10 minutes to change locomotives. Swindon station hosted the first recorded railway refreshment rooms, divided according to class. Swindonians, for a time, were eminently proud that even the current King and Queen of the time had partaken of refreshments there. The station in 1842 was built of three storeys, with the refreshment rooms on the ground floor, the upper floors comprising the station hotel and lounge.  Until 1961, when Swindon Town station closed, the station was known as Swindon Junction.

The original building was demolished in 1972, with today's modern station and office block erected on the site.

The Travel Centre (booking office) at Swindon was APTIS-equipped by the end of October 1986, making it one of the first stations with the ticketing system which was eventually found across the UK at all staffed British Rail stations by the end of the 1980s.

On 2 June 2003 Platform 4 opened. Prior to this all westbound trains had used Platform 3 and eastbound services Platform 1.  Services terminating or starting here on the lines to  via Chippenham and  use platform 2, a west-facing inset bay.

Stationmasters

Christopher Hill 1841 - 1852 (afterwards station master at Chippenham)
George Wasborough Andrewes 1852 - 1855 (formerly station master at Chippenham, afterwards station master at Birmingham)
John Holmes 1859 - 1873(formerly station master at Cirencester)
Mr. Reynolds 1873 - 1877
William Bonner 1877 - 1897 (formerly station master at Wrexham)
John Brewer 1897 - 1909 (formerly station master at Truro)
F.S. Davies from 1909 (formerly station master at Weymouth)
H.G. Cotterall 1915 - 1919 (formerly station master at Weymouth)
W. Thick 1919 - 1922 (formerly station master at Milford Haven)
S.N Cooper 1922 - 1930 (formerly station master at Pontypool)
Arthur Meddows Taylor 1930 - 1933 (brother of later station master Sidney, formerly station master at Didcot)
W.J. Pepler 1933 - 1935
Sidney Meddows Taylor 1935 - 1942 (brother of former station master Arthur, formerly station master at Bath)
G. Naylor 1942 - 1951 (formerly station master at Plymouth)
Ernest Sharples 1951 - 1955 (afterwards station master at Manchester London Road)

Services

All services at Swindon are operated by Great Western Railway.

The station is served by frequent intercity trains to London Paddington eastbound and westbound to Bristol, Cheltenham Spa and Cardiff along the Great Western Main Line as well as a local service to  via the Wessex Main Line.

The typical off-peak service in trains per hour is:
 5 tph to London Paddington
 2 tph to 
 1 tph to  via 
 1 tp2h to  via 

Additional services run during the peak periods and some existing services are extended further afield.

Panel box

The panel box is a Western Region Integra design built by Henry Williams (Darlington) and opened in March 1968. The box was decommissioned in February 2016 and the panel was moved for preservation to Didcot Railway Centre.

Plans
It was announced in December 2005 that stations in the Thames Valley region were to be upgraded.

In August 2014, Network Rail completed the redoubling of the track between Swindon and Kemble in order to improve rail services between London and Cheltenham/Gloucester, and to allow for maintenance work in the Severn Tunnel when Swansea services are diverted via Gloucester. , the Office of Rail Regulation was receiving submissions to restore this project (previously omitted) to Network Rail's plans for 2009–2014. The project cost was estimated at £50.2 million and received backing from the South West Development Agency and others but stalled when it was left out of the new Coalition Government's Spending Review in October 2010. Work commenced in January 2013 and was completed in August 2014.

On 1 March 2011, Secretary of State for Transport Philip Hammond announced that plans for electrifying the Great Western main line west from Didcot through Swindon to Bristol and Cardiff had resumed at a planned cost of £704 million. The electrification project had first been announced by the previous Government's Transport Secretary Andrew Adonis, on 23 July 2009.

Notes

References

External links

 

Buildings and structures in Swindon
Transport in Swindon
DfT Category C1 stations
Railway stations in Wiltshire
Former Great Western Railway stations
Railway stations in Great Britain opened in 1842
Great Western Main Line
South Wales Main Line
Railway stations served by Great Western Railway